Trifecta was the debut album released by the  guitarist Pavlo, Rik Emmett, Oscar Lopez. It originated with Pavlo’s long-standing inspiration by the famous guitar trio project of Paco de Lucía, Al Di Meola and John McLaughlin, Pavlo wanted to create a Canadian Guitar Trio.  When many thought it would be too difficult to collaborate with other musicians that were famous within their own genres, Pavlo called on legendary guitarists, Oscar Lopez, and Hall of Famer, Rik Emmett (lead guitarist from rock group, Triumph).

This album was nominated for a Juno Award in 2010 for Instrumental Album of the Year.

Track listing
"Melting Pot" – 5:01
"Redbird 250" – 3:23
"Moonlight On La Costanera" – 4:38
"Viola" – 4:04
"Trifecta" – 4:36	 
"Thousand Islands" – 4:30
"Dreamers" – 4:38 
"Jumpin' Django" – 2:07 
"Niko's Tiny Carousel" – 3:06
"(The Dance Of The) Three Jacks" – 3:30
"Fiesta" – 4:10

References

2009 debut albums
Rik Emmett albums